Sarah Jane Steele (born September 16, 1988) is an American actress. She is best known for her role as Marissa Gold on the CBS legal drama series The Good Wife (2011–2016) and its CBS All Access spinoff series The Good Fight (2017–2022).

Early life
Steele was born in Philadelphia, Pennsylvania. Her mother, Katherine A. High, is a hematology oncology physician at the University of Pennsylvania, and her father, George Steele, is an internal medicine physician specializing in nutrition who was on the faculty of the University of Pennsylvania School of Medicine. Steele graduated with the class of 2006 from The Episcopal Academy, a private school in southeast Pennsylvania. She graduated from Columbia University in 2011 with a B.A. in English.

Career
Steele had her breakout role as Bernice in  the 2004 comedy drama film Spanglish. Steele went on to appear in an episode of the crime drama series Law & Order; the dark comedy film Mr. Gibb, which co-stars Hayden Panettiere, Tim Daly and Dan Hedaya; and the drama film Margaret, which co-stars Matt Damon, Matthew Broderick, Anna Paquin, Mark Ruffalo, and Allison Janney.

Steele appeared in the Off-Broadway production of The Prime of Miss Jean Brodie, which ran in September 2006 to December 2006 at the Acorn Theater. From 2007 to 2008, she appeared in the Off-Broadway play Speech & Debate.  From January to March 2012 she appeared in the Off-Broadway play Russian Transport at the Acorn Theatre, playing the role of Mira. In late 2014, Steele made her Broadway debut in The Country House by Donald Margulies, playing the granddaughter, Susie, opposite Blythe Danner. In 2015, she appeared in the play The Humans, first Off-Broadway and then on Broadway. She has also appeared in other Off-Broadway and regional productions.

In 2009, Steele appeared on Gossip Girl as Kira Abernathy, Jenny Humphrey's rival at Cotillion and Eric van der Woodsen's friend. Steele appeared in three episodes of The Good Wife in 2011 as Marissa Gold, the daughter of Eli Gold (Alan Cumming). She reprised the role from 2014 to 2016 in the show's later seasons, appearing in a total of 22 episodes. She went on to reprise the role of Marissa Gold in the Good Wife spinoff series The Good Fight, which premiered on CBS All Access in 2017.

Filmography

Film

Television

Awards and nominations

References

External links
 
 BroadwayWorld.com interview with Sarah Steele, November 1, 2007

1988 births
21st-century American actresses
Actresses from Philadelphia
American child actresses
American film actresses
American television actresses
American stage actresses
Living people
Episcopal Academy alumni
Columbia College (New York) alumni